Shooting was contested at the 2011 Summer Universiade from August 18 to August 22 at the Shenzhen Shooting Hall and Clay-pigeon Shooting Field in Shenzhen, China. Men's and women's individual and team events was held.

Medal summary

Medal table

Men's events

Individual

Team

Women's events

Individual

Team

References

Universiade
2011 Summer Universiade events
Shooting at the Summer Universiade